The Cowon S9 is a touchscreen portable media player released in late 2008 by Cowon Systems, Inc. It features support for audio file formats such as MP3, Ogg Vorbis and FLAC, and video formats such as DivX and Xvid.

Specifications

References

Portable media players